USS YP-86 was a converted fishing vessel which served as an auxiliary patrol boat in the U.S. Navy during World War II.

History
She was laid down as a seiner in the Tacoma shipyard of Martinolich Shipbuilding Company. She was completed in 1937 and named Pacific Fisher (ON 236159). On 7 April 1941, she was acquired by the U.S. Navy and designated as a Yard Patrol Craft (YP). She was one of the initial ships assembled by Captain Ralph C. Parker for the Alaskan Sector, Northwest Sea Frontier, 13th Naval District colloquially known as the "Alaskan Navy". She spent her entire career serving in the Aleutian Islands.

On 27 June 1944, she was decommissioned. On 18 July 1944, she was struck from the Naval List. On 6 October 1944, she was transferred to the United States Maritime Administration. In 1945, she was sold to Coastwise Fisheries of Seattle, Washington. In 1961, she was sold to Merrill W. Henington of Seldovia, Alaska.

References

Auxiliary ships of the United States Navy
Ships built in Tacoma, Washington
1937 ships
Yard patrol boats of the United States Navy
Ships of the Aleutian Islands campaign